The Roar of '74 is a studio album by Buddy Rich, with his big band, released on the Groove Merchant Records label in the United States.  The album was released in the UK in 1974 on the Mooncrest label by B & C Records.

Track listing 
LP side A
 "Nutville" (Horace Silver) – 4:47 
 "Kilimanjaro Cookout" (Manny Albam) – 6:14
 "Big Mac" (Ernie Wilkins) – 5:54 
 "Backwoods Sideman" (John La Barbera) – 4:29 
LP side B
 "Time Check" (Don Menza) – 3:45 
 "Prelude to a Kiss" (Duke Ellington, Mack Gordon, Irving Mills) – 3:32 
 "Waltz of the Mushroom Hunters" (Greg Hopkins) – 7:16 
 "Senator Sam" (Wilkins) – 4:40

Personnel 
The Buddy Rich big band
 Joe Romano – alto saxophone
 Bob Martin – alto saxophone
 Pat La Barbera – tenor saxophone, soprano saxophone
 Bob Crea – tenor saxophone
 John Laws – baritone saxophone
 Charley Davis – trumpet
 Larry Hall – trumpet
 Greg Hopkins – trumpet
 John Hoffman – trumpet
Alan Kaplan – trombone
 Keith O'Quinn – trombone
John Leys – trombone, bass trombone
Joe Beck – guitar
Buddy Budson – piano
Tony Levin – double bass
Buddy Rich – drums
Jimmy Maeulen – conga
Sam Woodyard – percussion

References 

Groove Merchant 528
Mooncrest Crest 7

1974 albums
Buddy Rich albums
Groove Merchant albums
Albums produced by Sonny Lester